Anthony "Tony" J. Jordan is an Irish biographer. He is a native of Ballyhaunis, County Mayo. Jordan is a graduate of NUI Maynooth, University College Dublin, and St. Patrick's College, Drumcondra. He initially specialized in writing 'first' biographies. His early interest centered on the interaction between the figures of Major John MacBride, W. B. Yeats, and Maud Gonne. After discovering the MacBride Papers in the National Library of Ireland, he has made them available through his books in elucidation on MacBride from the criticism by W. B. Yeats and his admirers.

Publications 
 Tell my Mother I...  A Novel of Adoption.    2020
 MAUD GONNE'S MEN  Westport Books   2018.
 James Joyce Unplugged Westport Books   2017
 "William Thomas Cosgrave", in Dublin City Council and the 1916 Rising, Gibney John Ed. Dublin City Council 2016. 
 A Jesus Biography 2015 Westport Books   2015
 Arthur Griffith with James Joyce and W.B. Yeats – Liberating Ireland. Westport Books. . 2013.
 Eamon DeValera 1882–1975 Irish: Catholic: Visionary. Westport Books. . 2010.
 The Good Samaritans, Memoir of a Biographer. Westport Books.   2008.* '
 John A Costello 1891–1976 Compromise Taoiseach. Westport Books.   2007.
 WT Cosgrave  A Founder of Modern Ireland. Westport Books.  2006.
 "Christmas 1987 in The Quiet Quarter" Anthology of New Irish Writing Edited by Eoin Brady, New Island 2004. .
 W.B. YEATS Vain, Glorious Lout. A Maker of Modern Ireland. Westport Books. . 2003.
 The Yeats/Gonne/MacBride Triangle Westport Books  2000.
 Christy Brown's Women – a biography. Westport Books.  1998
 Willie Yeats and the Gonne-MacBrides. Westport Books. . 1997
 Churchill a founder of modern Ireland. Westport Books. . 1995.
 To Laugh or To Weep A Biography of Conor Cruise O'Brien. Blackwater Press.  1994
 Sean A Biography of Sean MacBride Blackwater Press.  1992
 Major John MacBride 1865–1916 MacDonagh & MacBride & Connolly & Pearse. Westport Historical Society. 1991

References

External links 
 Review of Arthur Griffith with James Joyce and WB Yeats – Liberating Ireland (paywalled)
 Review in the Sunday Independent

Living people
Year of birth missing (living people)
Place of birth missing (living people)
Irish biographers
Irish male non-fiction writers
Irish male writers
Male biographers
People from County Mayo